Parablennius sierraensis is a species of combtooth blenny found in the Eastern and Central Atlantic: Cape Verde and the Gambia to Namibe, Angola. The species name refers to Sierra Leone, the type location. However, the IUCN give the southern limit of the distribution as being Sierra Leone.

References

Further reading

 Fenner, Robert M. The Conscientious Marine Aquarist. Neptune City, New Jersey, USA: T.F.H. Publications, 2001.
 Helfman, G., B. Collette and D. Facey: The diversity of fishes. Blackwell Science, Malden, Massachusetts, USA, 1997.
 Moyle, P. and J. Cech.: Fishes: An Introduction to Ichthyology, 4th ed., Upper Saddle River, New Jersey, USA: Prentice-Hall. 2000.
 Nelson, J.: Fishes of the World, 3rd ed.. New York, USA: John Wiley and Sons., 1994

sierraensis
Fish described in 1990
Fish of the Atlantic Ocean
Fish of Angola
Fish of West Africa
Taxa named by Hans Bath